AFTC may refer to:
 Arabinofuranan 3-O-arabinosyltransferase, an enzyme
 Air Force Test Center
 Air Force Technical College, Bangalore